Absardeh (also Romanized as Ābsardeh; also known as Āb Sardeh-ye Seh Sok) is a village in Zaz-e Sharqi Rural District, Zaz va Mahru District, Aligudarz County, Lorestan Province, Iran.

Population
At the 2006 census, its population was 107, in 20 families.

References 

Towns and villages in Aligudarz County